John Swan  (born 15 March 1952), better known as Swanee, is an Australian rock singer.

He was born John Archibold Dixon Swan in Glasgow, Scotland in 1952. He is the older brother of singer-songwriter Jimmy Barnes, and an uncle of stage performer David Campbell.

In 2015, Swan was announced as South Australia's Senior Australian of the Year and in 2017 was appointed an Order of Australia Medal (OAM).

Career

1952–1978: Early life and bands
John Swan migrated to Australia with his family in 1961. When his mother remarried in the mid-1960s, he was the only child to keep the surname of his biological father, who was an adept boxer. Swan joined his first professional band, Happiness, as a drummer when he was fourteen. When he was seventeen, he enlisted in the Australian Army, and was discharged after two years of service. In early 1974 he was the drummer with The James Wright Band, moving on to Jim Keays' Southern Cross for a short time.

In 1975 he joined Adelaide band Fraternity replacing Bon Scott on vocals for two years. In 1977, Swan became the vocalist with Feather. This band had been known as Blackfeather in the early 1970s, but by 1977 no original members were left so the name was shortened. Feather recorded one single with Swan, "Girl Trouble", before he left in 1978 to establish himself as a solo artist.

1979–1986: Early solo career
Under the name Swanee by which he was already known, Swan released his debut solo single "Crazy Dreams" in 1979. An album, Into the Night, and several other singles followed but met with little commercial success.

In late 1981, his version of "If I Were a Carpenter" became a national hit, peaking at number 5. The single was followed by the 1982 studio album This Time It's Different that spawned another two hits, "Temporary Heartache" and "Lady What's Your Name", with the latter peaking at number 13 and was the 66th biggest selling single in Australia in 1982.

In 1986 Swanee featured in an advertising campaign for West End Draught, a South Australian beer. The brewer provided financial support to Swanee's tours and he in turn appeared in the company's TV commercials.

1987–1989: The Party Boys

In 1987, Swanee replaced Angry Anderson as lead singer of The Party Boys, a touring band with floating membership, formed in 1983 by Paul Christie of Mondo Rock. Swan's tenure with the band proved to be the group's most successful period. A cover of the John Kongos song "He's Gonna Step On You Again" peaked at number 1 on the Australian charts. The band's self-titled album made the Australian top 20. Swan remained with the band until 1989 before going solo again.

1990–present: Later solo career
Since 1990, Swan's recording career has been less than prolific, producing only two singles that year, including a cover of Little Richard's "Lucille" for The Delinquents film.

In 1997, Swan released Heart and Soul produced by Danny Bryan.

In 2007 Swan released the album Have a Little Faith (Liberation Records). The project was recorded with producer /guitarist Mark Moffatt. The album was recorded with Nashville musicians. The album is a reflection of his past troubles and his love for the Blues.

In 2009 he worked with fellow Australian artists Ray Burgess, Tommy Emmanuel, John St Peeters and Marty Rhone, to release the single "Legends of the Southern Land".

In July 2014 Swanee released the album One Day at a Time, consisting of entirely original work, in collaboration with Darren Mullan from the Adelaide Recording Studio and Tony Minniecon.

In 2017 Swanee was recognised for his work with various charitable organizations with the Order of Australia Medal (OAM).

In June 2021, Melodic Rock Records released a 20-track compilation titled Greatest Hits.

Discography

Studio albums

Live albums

Compilation albums

Singles

Other singles

See also
 Fraternity (band)
 The Party Boys

References

External links
 

1952 births
Living people
Australian male singers
The Party Boys members
People from Adelaide
Musicians from Glasgow
Australian Army soldiers
Scottish emigrants to Australia
Recipients of the Medal of the Order of Australia
Australian people of Scottish-Jewish descent
Swan musical family